Ligwalagwala FM is a South African national PBS radio station based in Mbombela, South Africa.

History
The year 2008 marked the rebirth of the station by launching a brand new, vibrant, jubilant and dynamic image. The launch of the new logo was ceremoniously followed by the station's birthday bash which was voted concert of the year by the Saturday Star newspaper.

Achievements :
SABC Gospel Crow Awards, PMR Awards,
2008 – Birthday Bash voted concert of the year by Saturday Star,
2008 – Top 10 Favourite Radio Station,
2013 – Top 10 Favourite Radio Station,
2012 – Best Gospel Radio Show,
2005 – Diamond Arrow,
2007 – Diamond Arrow,
2013 – Diamond Arrow,

Music format
Local Music (70%)
International Music (30%)
House Ntombe mhlophe(18%)
Kwaito (16%)
Gospel (15%)
R&B (13%)
Worl Music (9%)
South African Hip hop (8%)
Afro Pop
Choral
Contemporary Jazz
Reggae
Maskandi/Mbaqanga

Coverage areas and frequencies
Mpumalanga
Parts of Gauteng
Kwa-Zulu Natal
Limpopo
North West

Broadcast languages
siSWATI

Broadcast time
24/7

Target audience

Listenership figures

References

External links
 

Radio stations in South Africa
Mbombela
Mass media in Mpumalanga